Lingxia is a township of Taobei District, Baicheng, in northwestern Jilin province, People's Republic of China, located less than  southeast of the border with Inner Mongolia. , it has 5 residential communities and 11 villages under its administration.

See also 
 List of township-level divisions of Jilin

References 

Township-level divisions of Jilin